is a railway station in the city of Yokote, Akita Prefecture,  Japan, operated by JR East.

Lines

Station layout
The station consists of  one island platform connected to the station building by a level crossing.  The station is unattended.

Platforms

History
Kurosawa Station opened on November 27, 1921 as a station on the Japanese Government Railways (JGR), serving the village of Sannai, Akita. The JGR became the Japan National Railways (JNR) after World War II. The station was absorbed into the JR East network upon the privatization of the JNR on April 1, 1987.

Surrounding area

See also
List of railway stations in Japan

External links

 JR East Station information 

Railway stations in Japan opened in 1921
Railway stations in Akita Prefecture
Kitakami Line
Yokote, Akita